This is a list of airlines currently operating in Haiti.

See also
 List of airlines
 List of defunct airlines of Haiti

Haiti
Airlines
Airlines
Haiti